Howard Kapnek Schachman  (December 5, 1918 – August 5, 2016) was a graduate school professor in the Department of Molecular & Cell Biology at the University of California, Berkeley.

Early life
Schachman was born in Philadelphia in 1918. In high school he was interested in sociopolitical issues, inspired by his mother. He initially pursued liberal arts in college while studying to become a rabbi, before switching to chemical engineering in a university. He transferred from University of Pennsylvania to Massachusetts Institute of Technology where he graduated in 1939 with a chemical engineering degree.

Graduate studies
He received a Ph.D. from Princeton University in 1948 and joined the faculty of UC Berkeley. He signed but protested the loyalty oath required by the Regents of the University of California during McCarthyism. He was elected to the American Academy of Arts and Sciences (1966) and the United States National Academy of Sciences (1968).

Among many other honors, he received the AAAS Scientific Freedom and Responsibility Award in 2000.

The "Howard K. Schachman Public Service Award" of the ASBMB is named after him.

Teaching career
Each spring, he taught the MCB 293C course on Ethical Conduct of Research required for NIH-funded students. He died at the age of 97 on August 5, 2016.

Personal life
While at Princeton he married Ethel Lazarus.

References

External links
 Home page at the Department of Molecular & Cell Biology, University of California, Berkeley
 death announcement

Princeton University alumni
1918 births
2016 deaths
American biochemists
Jewish American scientists
Members of the United States National Academy of Sciences
University of California, Berkeley faculty
21st-century American Jews
University of Pennsylvania alumni
Massachusetts Institute of Technology alumni